Kenneth William Nicholas (3 February 1938 – 24 March 2007) was an English sportsman, best known for his football career. After playing both football and rugby for his country at schoolboy level, Nicholas became a professional footballer. He, playing in England as a full back, then featured for Arsenal, Watford, Guildford City, Hastings United and Tonbridge as well as teams in Portugal.

Career 

Born in Northampton, Nicholas represented England's schoolboy and youth football teams, as well as its rugby schoolboys team. He joined Football League First Division side Arsenal in 1955, but was unable to break into the team, and joined Fourth Division Watford on a free transfer in 1959. By contrast to his time at Arsenal, Nicholas under the management of Ron Burgess, immediately became a first-choice starter in Watford's team. In 1959–60, his first season at Watford, Nicholas helped Watford gain promotion to the Third Division for the first time in their history. Nicholas continued to play regularly for the Hornets over the following five seasons.

Ken Furphy, a full back himself, became Watford's player-manager in November 1964, and the 1964–65 season proved to be Nicholas's last at Vicarage Road. Altogether in his Watford career he made 219 appearances in all competitions.

In the summer of 1965 he joined Southern League side Guildford City. The following year he moved to Hastings United, and after a spell at Tonbridge, Nicholas moved to the Algarve in Portugal, where he finished his career.

Personal life
Nicholas died in Blackheath on 24 March 2007 after a long illness.

References 

1938 births
2007 deaths
Footballers from Northampton
English footballers
England youth international footballers
Arsenal F.C. players
Watford F.C. players
Guildford City F.C. players
Hastings United F.C. (1948) players
Tonbridge Angels F.C. players
English Football League players
Southern Football League players
English expatriate footballers
Association football fullbacks